The Nera  Plateau is a mountain plateau in the southeastern Sakha Republic (Oymyakon District) and the northwestern end of Magadan Oblast (Susumansky District), Far Eastern Federal District, Russia.

The Ust-Nera - Magadan tract of the R504 Kolyma Highway crosses the plateau from northwest to southeast. There are gold placers in certain spots of the Nera Plateau.

Geography  
The Nera Plateau is at the source area of the Nera River, a tributary of the Indigirka. Other rivers on it are the Ayan-Yuryakh, one of the rivers that form the Kolyma, and the Byoryolyokh, an Ayan Yuryakh tributary. The plateau is limited by ranges of the Chersky mountain system to the northeast, the Upper Kolyma Highlands to the southeast and the Tas-Kystabyt (Sarychev Range) to the southwest.

Flora
The plateau is in an area dominated by permafrost.

See also
Oymyakon Plateau

References

External links
Physiogeography of the Russian Far East

Plateaus of the Sakha Republic
Landforms of Magadan Oblast